Presidential elections were held in Iran on 8 June 2001, and resulted in Mohammad Khatami being elected as the President of Iran for his second term.

Candidates
Although 814 candidates registered for the election, including 25 women, the Guardian Council reduced it to ten.

The final candidates were: 
 Mohammad Khatami, Incumbent President
 Ahmad Tavakkoli, Former Minister of Labour and Social Affairs
 Ali Shamkhani, Incumbent Minister of Defense
 Abdollah Jassbi, Incumbent Chancellor of Islamic Azad University
 Mahmoud Kashani, Former Iranian delegation to the International Court of Justice
 Hassan Ghafourifard, Former Minister of Energy and Member of Parliament
 Mansour Razavi, Incumbent Member of City Council of Tehran
 Shahabedin Sadr, Former Member of Parliament
 Ali Fallahian, Former Minister of Intelligence
 Mostafa Hashemitaba, Incumbent Head of Physical Education Organization

Campaign 
After the scandalous final two years of his term, Mohammad Khatami was expected to be elected by a much smaller margin than in 1997. His term was marred by the unlawful arrest of political activists, killings of Iranian dissidents, and closure of several Iranian newspapers. Though Khatami was still believed to win by a landslide, this oppression was thought to significantly impact his performance in the election. Initially, Khatami had considered not running for reelection. But, after months of his supporters and party members pleading with him, he finally decided to declare his candidacy two months before the start of the election. Central to Khatami's campaign were the issues of economic revival, job growth, and democratic reform. Khatami also sought to restore the austerity of the Iranian Revolution. According to CNN, Khatami's aides described his campaign as a “referendum for reform”.  Most of Khatami's nine other challengers were independent conservatives, according to BBC.

Results

Turnout

References

2001
June 2001 events in Asia
2001 elections in Iran